Nathalee Joane Aranda Robinson (born 22 February 1995) is a Panamanian Olympic long jumper.

Aranda finished fourth in the long jump at the 2019 Pan American Games in Lima, Peru.
She also competed in the 2020 Summer Olympics.

References

External links
 

1995 births
Living people
Panamanian female long jumpers
Olympic athletes of Panama
Athletes (track and field) at the 2020 Summer Olympics
Pan American Games competitors for Panama
Athletes (track and field) at the 2019 Pan American Games
21st-century Panamanian women